Bahya ben Joseph ibn Paquda (also: Pakuda, Bakuda, Hebrew:), c. 1050–1120, was a Jewish philosopher and rabbi who lived at Zaragoza, Al-Andalus (now Spain). He was one of two people now known as Rabbeinu Behaye, the other being Bible commentator Bahya ben Asher.

Life and works
He was the author of the first Jewish system of ethics, written in Arabic around 1080 under the title Al Hidayah ila Faraid al-Qulub, Guide to the Duties of the Heart, and translated into Hebrew by Judah ibn Tibbon in the years 1161-80 under the title Chovot HaLevavot, The Duties of the Heart.

Little is known of his life except that he bore the title of dayan, judge at the rabbinical court. Bahya was thoroughly familiar with the Jewish rabbinic literature, as well as the philosophical and scientific Arabic, Greek and Roman literature, quoting frequently from the works of non-Jewish moral philosophers in his work.

Bahya says in the introduction to Duties of the Heart that he wished to fill a great need in Jewish literature; he felt that neither the rabbis of the Talmud nor subsequent rabbis adequately brought all the ethical teachings of Judaism into a coherent system.

Bahya felt that many Jews paid attention only to the outward observance of Jewish law, "the duties to be performed by the parts of the body" ("Hovot HaEvarim"), without regard to the inner ideas and sentiments that should be embodied in the Jewish way of life, "the duties of the heart" ("Hovot HaLev"). He also felt that many people disregarded all duties incumbent upon them, whether outward observances or inner moral obligations.

In his view, most people acted in accord with selfish, worldly motives. Bahya therefore felt impelled to make an attempt to present the Jewish faith as being essentially a great spiritual truth founded on reason, revelation (especially as regarding the Torah), and Jewish tradition. He laid stress on the willingness and the joyful readiness of the God-loving heart to perform life's duties. He wrote:

Many Jewish writers familiar with his work consider him an original thinker of high rank. According to the Jewish Encyclopedia:

The Chovot HaLevavot became a popular book among the Jews throughout the world, and parts of it were once recited for devotional purposes during the days before Rosh Hashanah, the Jewish New Year.

His works served as inspiration and foundation for many later Jewish writers, including Berachyah in his encyclopedic philosophical work Sefer Hahibbur (The Book of Compilation).

Neoplatonism
He often followed the method of the anonymously-authored "Encyclopedia of the 'Brethren of Purity'" ( Rasā'il Ikhwān ṣ-Ṣafā''').

Inclined to contemplative mysticism and asceticism, Bahya eliminated from his system every element that he felt might obscure monotheism, or might interfere with Jewish law. He wanted to present a religious system at once lofty and pure and in full accord with reason.

References

External links

 Shaar HaBitachon - Gate of Trust (English translation of the original Shaar HaBitachon from Chovot HaLevavot, Kehot 2021) 
The Duties of the Heart (partial translation) at sacred-texts.com 
 Duties of the Heart / Chovot HaLevavot - free complete English translation
 Bahya Ben Joseph ibn Pakuda, jewishencyclopedia.com article written by Kaufmann Kohler & Isaac Broydé.
 Rabbi Bachaya Ibn Pakuda, at OU.org
 The Book of Direction to the Duties of the Heart, from the Original Arabic Version of Bahya Ben Joseph Ibn Pakuda's al-Hidaya ila Fara'id al-Qulub by Menahem Mansoor (the only English translation from the original Arabic)
 A Sufi-Jewish Dialogue: Philosophy and Mysticism in Bahya ibn Paquda's Duties of the Heart'', Diana Lobel
 

Ibn Paquda, Bahya
12th-century rabbis in al-Andalus
11th-century rabbis in al-Andalus
Writers of Musar literature
Jewish ethicists